Missouri's 29th Senatorial District is one of 34 districts in the Missouri Senate. The district is based in Southwest Missouri and includes all of the counties of Barry, Lawrence, McDonald, and Christian.

The district is currently represented by Republican Mike Moon of Ash Grove.

District Profile
Major cities in the district include the popular tourist destination of Branson as well as Monett, Aurora, and Hollister. In addition to Branson, the district is home to College of the Ozarks.

The district, anchored in the longtime GOP bastion of Southwest Missouri, is solidly Republican. Although it is a relatively diverse rural district, the GOP still dominates every level of government in the district.

Demographics
According to the 2010 U.S. Census:
Population: 172,783
White/Caucasian: 93.10%
Hispanic/Latino: 5.74%
Some Other Race: 2.62%
Two or More Races: 1.98%
Native American: 1.03%
Asian: 0.65%
Black/African American: 0.45%
Pacific Islander: 0.18%

Voting in Statewide Elections

Election results

2020

2016

2012

2008

2005

2004

2000

1996

References

Missouri General Assembly
Missouri State Senate districts